Adam Richardson Bond is a multi-ethnic, British-American actor and stage director. He began his career as a teenager as a film extra in Stanley Kubrick's final film, Eyes Wide Shut. He has had minor roles in films such as Green Zone, Legally Blonde, National Treasure: Book of Secrets and Inkheart. During spring 2016 and 2017, he has portrayed Jesus Christ for CNN's continuing docudrama series Finding Jesus: Faith, Fact, Forgery, in tandem with the Christian faith's observance of the Passion of Christ and Easter. He reprises this role in the 2019 Amazon Prime series Good Omens.

Career

Film and television
For two seasons, Bond played the title role in global U.S.-based cable news outlet CNN's docudrama Finding Jesus: Faith, Fact, Forgery. This is in conjunction with the Christian faith's recognition of Jesus' time on Earth as the Son of God, focusing on his three-year ministry that led to his betrayal, crucifixion, death, and resurrection, and their related observances of the Last Supper, Good Friday, and Easter Sunday. Bond's multiethnic background and features assisted in his being cast for the role of Christ.

Filmography

Theatre appearances

References

External links 

 
 Official Adam Bond Website

1981 births
People from Wimbledon, London
Male actors from London
English male film actors
English male stage actors
English male television actors
Living people
People educated at The American School in London
Alumni of the University of St Andrews